The Department of Transport was an Australian government department that existed between April 1930 and April 1932.

Scope
Information about the department's functions and/or government funding allocation could be found in the Administrative Arrangements Orders, the annual Portfolio Budget Statements and in the department's annual reports.

At its creation, the department was responsible for the following:
Assisted migration from Great Britain, comprising household workers, boys for farms and re-union of families. Functions include approval or otherwise of requisitions by States for migrants; examination, selection and approval in Great Britain;  also transportation to Australia
Australian Overseas Transport Association
Commonwealth Railways
Co-ordination of Australian transport services- Collection and dissemination of information regarding Australia's resources and production, including transport  and taxation
Federal Transport Council
Interstate railway freights
Mechanical transport development, including 
the testing of various types of motor vehicles likely to cheapen and improve Australian transport;  
use in motor vehicles of Australian fuel, such as producer gas from charcoal;  
dissemination of information regarding the latest overseas developments affecting motor transport.
Overseas transport
Unification of railway gauges
War Service Homes

Structure
The department was a Commonwealth Public Service department, staffed by officials who were responsible to the Minister for Transport, Parker Moloney until January 1932 and then Archdale Parkhill.

The secretary of the department was Herbert Charles Brown.

References

Ministries established in 1930
Transport
1930 establishments in Australia
1932 disestablishments in Australia
Defunct transport organisations based in Australia